Pilot is a populated place in Davidson County, North Carolina, United States.

Geography

Pilot is located at latitude 35.8801370 and longitude -80.1294899. The elevation is 791 feet.

References

Unincorporated communities in Davidson County, North Carolina
Unincorporated communities in North Carolina